Lessertia is a genus of  dwarf spiders that was first described by F. P. Smith in 1908.  it contains only two species, both found in Algeria, Canada, Morocco, New Zealand, Portugal, Spain, and Turkey: L. barbara and L. dentichelis.

See also
 List of Linyphiidae species (I–P)

References

Araneomorphae genera
Linyphiidae
Spiders of Africa
Spiders of New Zealand
Spiders of North America